The scientific production association (NPO) is a form of scientific research-to-production enterprise in the Soviet Union and its successor states, including Russia and other union republics.

They first appeared in the late 1960s, after a Soviet decree was approved on 24 September 1968 to reform research and development structures; by 1980 there were 250 NPOs in the Soviet Union.

NPOs were established to consolidate research and production activities into a single entity. They were meant to bridge the technological gap between design bureaus and production plants, as new designs were often developed without considering the technical capabilities of the production facilities, leading to long delays between the start of development and serial production.

They are usually headed by a research or design organization. Though they exist in many sectors, they are most common in electrical engineering, electronics, aviation, instrument-making and chemical industries.

Research and production association (abb. NPO), also a research and production enterprise (abb. NPP; научно-производственное предприятие (НПП)) is an organization of any organizational and legal form that conducts research and development along with their development in production and production. As a rule, the structure of the NPO includes research, design and engineering, technological organizations, pilot production and industrial enterprises.

List of NPOs

 NPO Altair
 NPO Almaz
 NPO Antey
 NPO Biosintez
 NPO Electropribor (Kharkiv, Ukraine)
 NPO Energomash (Moscow)
 NPO ELSIB (Novosibirsk)
 NPO Novator (Yekaterinburg)
 NPO Almaz (Moscow)
 NPO Avtomatiki (Yekaterinburg)
 NPO Lavochkin (Khimki)
 NPO Luch (Novosibirsk)
 NPO Luch (Podolsk)
 NPO Mashinostroyeniya (Reutov)
 NPO Molniya (Moscow)
 NPO NIIIP-NZiK (Novosibirsk)
 NPO Orion (Moscow)
 NPO Petrovax (Moscow)
 NPO Polyot (Omsk)
 NPO Splav (Tula)
 NPO Tekhnomash (Moscow)
 NPO Toriy (Moscow)
 NPO Trud/Kusnetsov (Samara)
 NPO Yuzhnoye (Dnipro) designers of the R-12 Dvina rocket

References

See also
Production association

Types of business entity
Science and technology in the Soviet Union
Companies of the Soviet Union
Research institutes in the Soviet Union
Aerospace companies of the Soviet Union
Soviet and Russian space institutions
Rocket engine manufacturers of Russia
Government-owned companies of Russia
Roscosmos divisions and subsidiaries
Aerospace companies of Russia
Aerospace companies of Ukraine